The Hundred of Finniss is a cadastral unit of hundred in South Australia on the west bank of the lower Murray River. It is one of the ten hundreds of the County of Sturt. The main population centre in the hundred is the township of Mannum, a river port. Apart from Mannum and Port Mannum, other localities within the hundred are Punthari in the north, Frayville and Apamurra in the west, the riverside hamlets of Pellaring Flat and Zadows Landing in the east, and parts of Wall Flat, Milendella, Tepko, and Caloote.

References

Finniss
1860 establishments in Australia